Petunia is genus of 20 species of flowering plants of South American origin. The popular flower of the same name derived its epithet from the French, which took the word petun, meaning "tobacco," from a Tupi–Guarani language.  A tender perennial, most of the varieties seen in gardens are hybrids (Petunia × atkinsiana, also known as Petunia × hybrida).

Taxonomy
Petunia is a genus in the family Solanaceae, subfamily Petunioideae. Well known members of Solanaceae in other subfamilies include tobacco (subfamily Nicotianoideae), and the cape gooseberry, tomato, potato, deadly nightshade and chili pepper (subfamily Solanoideae). Some botanists place the plants of the genus Calibrachoa in the genus Petunia, but this is not accepted by others. Petchoa is a hybrid genus derived from crossing Calibrachoa and Petunia.

Species
Species include:

Ecology
Petunias are generally insect pollinated, with the exception of P. exserta, which is a rare, red-flowered, hummingbird-pollinated species.  Most petunias are diploid with 14 chromosomes and are interfertile with other petunia species, as well as with Calibrachoa.

The tubular flowers are favoured by some Lepidoptera species, including the Hummingbird hawk moth.

Cultivation
Petunias can tolerate relatively harsh conditions and hot climates, but not frost. They need at least five hours of sunlight every day and flourish in moist soil and conditions of low atmospheric humidity. They are best grown from seed. Watering once a week should be sufficient in most regions. Hanging baskets and other containers need more frequent watering. Maximum growth occurs in late spring. Applying fertilizer monthly or weekly, depending on the variety, will help the plant grow quickly.

In horticulture many terms are used to denote different types of cultivated petunia. These include Grandiflora, Multiflora, Wave (Spreading), Supertunia, Cascadia and Surfinia.

AGM cultivars
The following is a selection of cultivars which have received the Royal Horticultural Society's Award of Garden Merit:
 
='Conblue'  
='Conglow'  
='Constraw'  
='Kleph15313'  
'Storm Lavender'  
'Storm Pink' 
'Storm Salmon'  
='Suntosol' 
='Sunpurple'  
='Kerpril'

Uses
Many species other than Petunia × atkinsiana are also gaining popularity in the home garden.  A wide range of flower colours, sizes, and plant architectures are available in both Petunia × atkinsiana and other species, listed below:

Symbolism and folklore
The Maya and Inca believed that the scent of petunias had the power to ward off underworld monsters and spirits. Their flower-buds were bunched together for magical drinks. According to New Age folklore, Petunias will only thrive where there is "positive energy" and will not grow in places where there is "negativity".

When given as a gift, Petunias have (in the language of flowers) two mutually exclusive meanings, symbolising on the one hand being comfortable with someone, and on the other anger and resentment.

Gallery

References

External links

 
Solanaceae genera
Flora of Pakistan
Garden plants
Taxa named by Antoine Laurent de Jussieu